Viktor Hovland (born 18 September 1997) is a Norwegian professional golfer who plays on the PGA Tour. He won the 2018 U.S. Amateur and then became the first Norwegian to win on the PGA Tour (at the 2020 Puerto Rico Open) and on the European Tour (at the 2021 BMW International Open). Hovland picked up his second and third PGA Tour wins at the 2020 and 2021 Mayakoba Golf Classic.

Amateur career
Hovland played college golf at Oklahoma State University. In 2014, Hovland won the Norwegian Amateur Golf Championship.

Hovland won the 2018 U.S. Amateur, the first Norwegian player to do so, and earned invitations into the 2019 Masters Tournament, the 2019 U.S. Open, and the 2019 Open Championship. He played in the 2018 Emirates Australian Open as an amateur, finishing tied for 13th place.

Hovland was the low amateur in the 2019 Masters Tournament, finishing three under par in a tie for 32nd. With this performance he rose to number one in the World Amateur Golf Ranking. In the  2019 U.S. Open, he finished in 12th place and was low amateur with a score of 280. This was the lowest 72-hole score by an amateur in the U.S. Open, breaking the previous record of 282, set by Jack Nicklaus in 1960. He became the first player to win low amateur honors at both the Masters and U.S. Open in the same season since Matt Kuchar in 1998. In 2019, he was the recipient of the Ben Hogan Award, awarded to the best college player in the United States.

Professional career

2019
Hovland turned professional following the 2019 U.S. Open, and made his professional debut at the Travelers Championship in June. By doing so, he forfeited his automatic entry to the 2019 Open Championship.

In August, Hovland finished tied for second in the Albertsons Boise Open, part of the Korn Ferry Tour Finals. This finish secured him a PGA Tour card for the 2019–20 season. Hovland set a PGA Tour record for most consecutive rounds in the 60s with 19 lasting into the second round of the CJ Cup in South Korea.

2020: First win
In February, Hovland became the first Norwegian to win on the PGA Tour when he won the Puerto Rico Open. In December, Hovland picked up his second PGA Tour win, and his first at a full-strength PGA Tour tournament, by birdieing the 72nd hole at the Mayakoba Golf Classic.

2021
In June, Hovland became the first Norwegian to win on the European Tour when he won the BMW International Open.

In September, Hovland played on the European team in the 2021 Ryder Cup at Whistling Straits in Kohler, Wisconsin. The U.S. team won 19–9 and Hovland went 0–3–2 and tied his Sunday singles match against Collin Morikawa.

In November, Hovland successfully defended his title at the World Wide Technology Championship at Mayakoba in Playa del Carmen, Mexico. He won by four strokes and set a tournament record of 23 under par. A month later, Hovland won the Hero World Challenge, finishing at 18 under par, one shot ahead of Scottie Scheffler. Key moments in this win were back-to-back eagles in the final round on holes 14 and 15. This win cemented his new nickname as the "Resort King" of golf, as his first 5 professional wins were outside of the Contiguous United States, 4 of which around the Caribbean Sea.

2022
Hovland started the year with a top-5 finish at the European Tour's Abu Dhabi HSBC Championship in January. The following week he won the Slync.io Dubai Desert Classic; after shooting a final-round 66, he made a birdie on the first hole of a sudden-death playoff to defeat Richard Bland. The win lifted him to number three in the Official World Golf Ranking.

In December 2022, Hovland successfully defended his title at the Hero World Challenge at Albany in the Bahamas, matching Tiger Woods as the only player with back-to-back wins in the event.

Amateur wins
2013 Norgescup 7, Team Norway Junior Tour 6
2014 Alcaidesa Winter Open, Titleist Tour 2, Norwegian Amateur Golf Championship (Norgesmesterskapet)
2018 Valspar Collegiate, U.S. Amateur, Royal Oaks Intercollegiate
2019 The Prestige

Source:

Professional wins (7)

PGA Tour wins (3)

European Tour wins (2)

European Tour playoff record (1–0)

Other wins (2)

Results in major championships
Results not in chronological order in 2020.

LA = Low amateur

"T" = tied for place
WD = withdrew
NT = No tournament due to COVID-19 pandemic

Summary

Most consecutive cuts made – 6 (2019 Masters – 2021 PGA)
Longest streak of top-10s – 1 (current)

Results in The Players Championship

CUT = missed the halfway cut
"T" indicates a tie for a place

Results in World Golf Championships

1Cancelled due to COVID-19 pandemic

NT = No tournament
"T" = Tied
Note that the Championship and Invitational were discontinued from 2022.

Team appearances
Amateur
European Boys' Team Championship (representing Norway): 2013, 2014, 2015
Summer Youth Olympics (representing Norway): 2014
Jacques Léglise Trophy (representing Continental Europe): 2015 (tie)
European Amateur Team Championship (representing Norway): 2016, 2017
Eisenhower Trophy (representing Norway): 2016, 2018
Arnold Palmer Cup (representing Europe): 2017, 2018

Sources:

Professional
Ryder Cup (representing Europe): 2021

See also
2019 Korn Ferry Tour Finals graduates

References

External links
 
 
 
 
 

Norwegian male golfers
PGA Tour golfers
Olympic golfers of Norway
Golfers at the 2020 Summer Olympics
Golfers at the 2014 Summer Youth Olympics
Oklahoma State Cowboys golfers
Korn Ferry Tour graduates
Norwegian expatriate sportspeople in the United States
Sportspeople from Oslo
People from Stillwater, Oklahoma
1997 births
Living people